The 2020–21 Algerian Women's Championship was the 23rd season of the Algerian Women's Championship, the Algerian national women's association football competition. Afak Relizane won the competition for the ninth time. For the first time, the champions partiticipate to the first 2021 CAF Women's Champions League.

Clubs

Group stage

Centre-West Group

Centre-East Group

Final stage

Play-down stage

ESF Amizour relegated to the Division 2.

Play-off stage

References

Algerian Women's Championship seasons